Berkan Taz (born 19 December 1998) is a German professional footballer who plays as an attacking midfielder for Waldhof Mannheim.

Career
Taz made his professional debut for Union Berlin in the 2. Bundesliga on 4 February 2019, coming on as a substitute in the 78th minute for Julian Ryerson in the 3–2 away loss against FC St. Pauli. He spent the 2019–20 season on loan at Energie Cottbus in Regionalliga Nordost where he amassed 15 goals und 10 assists in 27 matches.

On 5 October 2020, the last day of the 2020 summer transfer window, Taz moved to SC Verl, newly promoted to the 3. Liga.

References

External links
 
 

1998 births
Living people
Footballers from Berlin
German footballers
Turkish footballers
German people of Turkish descent
Association football midfielders
Hertha Zehlendorf players
1. FC Union Berlin players
FC Energie Cottbus players
SC Verl players
Borussia Dortmund II players
SV Waldhof Mannheim players
2. Bundesliga players
3. Liga players
Regionalliga players